Fred McKenzie may refer to:

 Fred McKenzie (footballer) (1903–1979), Scottish footballer
 Fred McKenzie (politician) (1933–2008), Australian politician
 Fred McKenzie (weightlifter), bronze medalist in weightlifting at the 1984 Summer Paralympics